Tarzan and the Jungle Boy is a 1968 adventure film starring Mike Henry in his third and final appearance as Tarzan. Rafer Johnson and Aliza Gur co-star. The film was produced by Sy Weintraub and Robert Day, written by Stephen Lord (based on the character created by Edgar Rice Burroughs) and directed by Robert Gordon. It was released on May 1, 1968.

Plot

At home in Africa, Tarzan (Mike Henry) assists a photojournalist named Myrna (Aliza Gur) and her associate Ken (Ron Gans) in their search for Erik Brunik (Steve Bond), a thirteen-year-old boy lost in the jungle since he was seven years old. Tarzan is assisted by his friend Buhara (Ed Johnson) whose brother Nagambi (Rafer Johnson) does not wish the boy found, and attempts to kill him before Tarzan saves the day.

Cast
 Mike Henry as Tarzan
 Rafer Johnson as Nagambi, villain who hinders Tarzan's search for the Jungle Boy
 Aliza Gur as Myrna, photojournalist searching for Erik
 Steve Bond as Erik Brunik, the missing Jungle Boy
 Ron Gans as Ken, Myrna's associate
 Ed Johnson as Buhara, ally to Tarzan, brother of Nagambi

Production notes
Tarzan and the Jungle Boy was filmed in Brazil and along the Amazon River immediately after production of the previous film, Tarzan and the Great River.

All three of Mike Henry's Tarzan films were completed before the first (Tarzan and the Valley of Gold) was released in 1966.

The roles of opposing brothers Nagambi and Buhara were played by real life brothers Rafer and Ed Johnson.

Mike Henry was attacked and his jaw bitten by the chimpanzee playing Cheeta during filming (named Dinky in the previous production, Tarzan and the Great River) and sued Sy Weintraub's Banner Productions. Citing exhaustion and unsafe work conditions in the suit, he bowed out of the Tarzan television series (for which he had been signed to play the lead).  The case was settled for an undisclosed sum.  Ron Ely replaced him as Tarzan in the TV series.

If one does not count two later theatrical releases of episodes from the Ron Ely TV series, this film was the final release in the "mainstream" Tarzan film franchise that had begun in 1918. The next official made-for-theatrical release production featuring the character would be Tarzan, the Ape Man, an attempted rebooting of the concept, in 1981.

References

Essoe, Gabe. Tarzan of The Movies, 1968, published by The Citadel Press.

External links
 
 
 
 ERBzine Silver Screen: Tarzan and the Jungle Boy

1968 films
1960s fantasy adventure films
American sequel films
Films set in 1968
Films set in Africa
Films shot in Brazil
Paramount Pictures films
Tarzan films
American fantasy adventure films
Films produced by Sy Weintraub
1960s English-language films
1960s American films